From 1935 to 1971 civil defence in the United Kingdom was the responsibility of the Civil Defence Department and resulted in the establishment during 1957 of the United Kingdom Warning and Monitoring Organisation. On the run-down of civil defence in 1971 the department was replaced by the Home Defence and Emergency Services Division of the Home Office.

The senior official of the department was the Director-General of Civil Defence, also known as the Inspector-General.

Senior officials:

Director-General of Civil Defence
General Sir Sidney Kirkman, GCB KBE MC 1954-1960

Director-General of Civil Defence Training
Wing Commander Sir John Hodsoll, CB 1948-1954

Inspector-General of Civil Defence
Air Chief Marshal Sir Walter Merton, GBE KCB 1964-1968
Lieutenant-General Sir William Stratton 1960-1962
Wing Commander Sir John Hodsoll, CB 1938-1948

Secretary
Sir William Brown, KCB  CBE c.44

Deputy Under Secretary of State
F L T Graham-Harrison, CB 1963-1974

Under Secretary
O C Allen, CB CBE c.44
Harold Emmerson 1940-42

Emergency management in the United Kingdom